Yuanzhao Temple is a Buddhist temple located in Taihuai Town of Wutai County, Xinzhou, Shanxi, China.

History
In the early years of Yongle period (1403-1424) of Ming dynasty (1368-1644), the Nepalese Buddhist monk Shilisha came to China to preach Buddhism. To commemorate him, Xuande Emperor (1399-1435) gave orders to build a Buddhist temple in Mount Wutai.

Architecture
Along the central axis are Shanmen, Hall of Four Heavenly Kings, Mahavira Hall and Dugang Hall. There are over 10 halls and rooms on both sides, including wing-room and dormitory.

Shanmen
Shanmen are usually built in a row with a big one in the middle and two small ones on two sides, but the shanmen of Yuanzhao Temple are built in a row with a big one in the middle and four small ones on two sides, so the shanmen are known as the Wuchaomen. On both sides of the shanmen there are two Chinese guardian lions.

Hall of Four Heavenly Kings
The Maitreya Buddha and Four Heavenly Kings' statues are enshrined in the Hall of Four Heavenly Kings. They are the eastern Dhṛtarāṣṭra, the southern Virūḍhaka, the western Virūpākṣa, and the northern Vaiśravaṇa. Inside the hall, two plaques with Chinese couplet are hung on the two side pillars. It says "". Under the eaves is a plaque written by Qianlong Emperor (1735-1796) in the Qing dynasty (1644-1911).

Mahavira Hall
The Mahavira Hall is the second hall and main hall in the temple. In the middle is the statue of Sakyamuni, statues of Amitabha and Bhaisajyaguru stand on the left and right sides of Sakyamuni's statue. The statue of Manjushri is placed in front of the statue of Sakyamuni. The statues of Eighteen Arhats stand on both sides of the hall.

Dugang Hall
The Dugang Hall is the third hall of the temple for the worship of a statue of the Nepalese Buddhist monk Shilisha. The name of Dugang Hall derives from an official position title "Dugang" of the Later Qin (384-417), which in charge of Buddhist temples, Buddhist monks and bestowal of office.

Stupa
The stupa of Shilisha in the backyard of the temple.

Gallery

References

Buddhist temples in Xinzhou
Gelug monasteries and temples
Wutai County
Xinzhou